The 1st Michigan Infantry Regiment was an infantry regiment that served in the Union Army during the American Civil War.

Service
The 1st Michigan Infantry was organized at Detroit, Michigan and mustered into Federal service for a three-year enlistment on September 16, 1861. This regiment retained the number of the original 1st Michigan raised for a three-month enlistment.

The regiment was mustered out on July 19, 1865.

Total strength and casualties
The regiment suffered 15 officers and 172 enlisted men who were killed in action or mortally wounded and 1 officer and 149 enlisted men who died of disease, for a total of 337 
fatalities.

Commanders
 Colonel John C. Robinson
 Colonel Ira C. Abbott

See also
List of Michigan Civil War units
Michigan in the American Civil War

Notes

References
The Civil War Archive

Units and formations of the Union Army from Michigan
1865 disestablishments in Michigan
1861 establishments in Michigan
Military units and formations established in 1861
Military units and formations disestablished in 1865